Daniel Carasso (December 16, 1905 – May 17, 2009) was a  French American member of the prominent Sephardic Jewish Carasso family and the son of Isaac Carasso, founder of the (now) multinational Danone.

Biography
Carasso, son of Isaac Carasso, was born in Salonica, Ottoman Empire (modern Thessaloniki, Greece), where his family had lived for four hundred years following Spain's expulsion of its Jews. In 1916, after the Balkan Wars, the family moved to Barcelona. In 1919, Carasso's father began marketing a yogurt that he named 'Danone' after Daniel, whose nickname in Catalan was Danon.

In 1923, Carasso enrolled in business school in Marseille, France, and studied bacteriology at the Pasteur Institute. He took over the family business. In 1939, he opened a branch in France. 

He settled in the United States in 1941 after fleeing France when it was invaded by the Nazis. Carasso returned to France in 1951.

Death

He died at his home in Paris at the age of 103.

Dannon Yogurt
In 1942, he formed a partnership with two family friends, Joe Metzger, a Swiss-born Spanish businessman, and his son Juan. They bought a small Greek yogurt company, Oxy-Gala, and founded Dannon Milk Products in Bronx, New York.
In 1947, Dannon added jam to its yogurt as a concession to American tastes and succeeded in growing sales to a broad market. He expanded the business into cheeses and other foodstuffs, and bought the American company from Beatrice Foods in 1981, changing the name to Groupe Danone.

References

1905 births
2009 deaths
20th-century French Sephardi Jews
French centenarians
People who emigrated to escape Nazism
Jews from Thessaloniki
Men centenarians
Emigrants from the Ottoman Empire to Spain
Spanish emigrants to France
French emigrants to the United States
Groupe Danone people